Shang Rong (Chinese: 商容; Pinyin: Shāng Róng) was a high official of Shang dynasty. He is also a major character featured in the classic Chinese novel Fengshen Yanyi.

Plot in Fengshen Yanyi
Shang Rong is renowned as the head Prime Minister over the Shang dynasty – in which he has served for over three generations. Upon seeing the growing cruelty of the king, Shang Rong is too filled with grief to stay in the kingdom. Thus, he asks to be pardoned. Soon after the king has given his consent, Shang Rong is confronted by many loyal officials of the dynasty, who headed out to say a tearful farewell to their respected friend. While addressing the officials outside the capital, Zhaoge, Shang Rong spoke as follows: "My dear princes and colleagues, I would be glad to give my life if I knew it would do any good. You are the pillars of the country; do your best to save the kingdom. Let us drink to old times and I know we will see each other again." Thus, after speaking to the officials and composing a short poem as a symbol of his internal anguish, Shang Rong took his leave of the dynasty.

Later on, following the prince-capturing arc, the Crown Prince runs into the home of the retired prime minister, Shang Rong. After Shang Rong heard the whole story about this incident, he sets out once again in an attempt to instill some level of intelligence into King Zhou. After a harsh conflict with the king, Shang Rong continuously remonstrates the king over his foolish ways. Soon enough, even after receiving the threat of being beaten to death with a golden mallet, Shang Rong, speaking in immense anger, says these, his final words: "I am not afraid to die! But I must ask your late father, my old king Da Yi, to pardon me, his old Prime Minister, for recommending you for the throne. I am so sorry that I cannot help anyone anymore!" Thus, immediately following this, Shang Rong ends his life by banging his head against a nearby column, in order to put his great resentment to a concluding rest.

Shang Rong was appointed as the deity of Yutang Star (玉堂星) in the end.

Notes

References
 Investiture of the Gods chapter 1–9

Shang dynasty politicians
Investiture of the Gods characters
Chinese gods